Strood (1st) (locally known as and marked on old maps as The Old Terminus) was a terminus of the South Eastern Railway located in Strood and serving also the towns of Chatham and Rochester. It closed for passengers in 1856 when the present Strood station was opened. The site was then used as a sidings yard until around 1990. It is now occupied by housing development and industrial units.

Maps

References

Disused railway stations in Kent
Former South Eastern Railway (UK) stations
Railway stations in Great Britain opened in 1845
Railway stations in Great Britain closed in 1856